Walkin' in the Sun is the forty-sixth album by American singer/guitarist Glen Campbell, released in 1990 (see 1990 in music). It includes the single "She's Gone Gone Gone", Campbell's last Top 10 hit on the country music charts. The single itself was released via Universal Records, a short-lived label founded by Jimmy Bowen, instead.  This album, however, marked his return to Capitol Records.

Track listing
 "She's Gone, Gone, Gone" (Harlan Howard) – 2:46
 "You Will Not Lose" (Allen Toussaint) – 2:37 (duet with Steve Wariner)
 "On a Good Night" (Jim Weatherly, Keith Stegall) – 3:23
 "If I Could Only Get My Hands on You Now" (Larry Gatlin) – 3:17
 "Walkin' in the Sun" (Jeff Barry) – 2:27
 "William Tell Overture" (Gioachino Rossini, arranged by Glen Campbell and Dennis McCarthy) – 2:44
 "Woodcarver" (Rusty Wolfe) – 3:21 (duet with Lacy J. Dalton)
 "Cheatin' Is" (Rafe Van Hoy) – 2:16
 "Tied to the Tracks" (J. Fred Knobloch, Gary Scruggs) – 2:40
 "Somebody's Leavin'" (Curly Putman, Rafe Van Hoy, Don Cook) – 2:04
 "Jesus on Your Mind" (Keith Stegall) – 2:39

Personnel

Glen Campbell – lead vocals, backing vocals, acoustic guitar, electric guitar
Larrie Londin – drums
James Stroud – drums
Reggie Young – electric guitar
Billy Joe Walker Jr. – acoustic guitar
Pat Flynn – acoustic guitar
David Hungate – bass guitar
Michael Rhodes – bass guitar
Glen Hardin – piano
Larry Knechtel – piano
Mike Lawler – synthesizer
David Innis – synthesizer
Mark O'Connor – mandolin, fiddle
Béla Fleck – banjo
Conni Ellisor – violin
John Cowan – additional backing vocals
Debby Campbell Olson – additional backing vocals
Gail Davies – additional backing vocals
Larry Gatlin, Steve Gatlin, Rudy Gatlin, Mark Gray, Alan Jackson, Kathy Mattea, Paul Overstreet, Eddy Raven, Ricky Skaggs, Sharon White, Keith Stegall, Karen Staley, Cheryl White Warren, Buck White, Chris Zann – backing vocals on "Jesus on Your Mind"
Technical
Jimmy Bowen – producer
Glen Campbell – producer
Ron Treat – engineer
John Guess – engineer, overdubs
Russ Martin – engineer, overdubs
Tim Kish – engineer, overdubs
David Boyer – engineer
Julian King – engineer
Bob Bullock – overdubs
Glenn Meadows/Masterfonics – mastering
Jessie Nobel – project coordinator
Virginia Team – art direction
Jerry Joyner – design
 Beverly Parker – photography

Charts
Singles – Billboard (United States)

References

Glen Campbell albums
1990 albums
Capitol Records albums
Albums produced by Jimmy Bowen